Naved is a surname and male given name. Notable people with this name include:

Surname
 Faisal Naved (born 1980), Pakistani cricket player
 Kashif Naved (born 1983), Pakistani cricket player
 Mohammad Naved, Pakistani terrorist
 Mohammad Naved (cricketer) (born 1988), Pakistani cricket player
 Rana Naved-ul-Hasan (born 1978), Pakistani cricket player

Given name
 Naved Ahmed (cricketer, born 1971) (born 1971), Pakistani cricket player
 Naved Ahmed (cricketer, born 1978) (born 1978), Pakistani cricket player
 Naved Ahmed (cricketer, born 1986) (born 1986), Indian cricket player
 Naved Anjum (born 1963), Pakistani cricket player
 Naved Arif (born 1981), Pakistani cricket player
 Naved Ashraf (born 1974), Pakistani cricket player
 Naved Aslam, Indian actor and screenwriter
 Naved Jaffrey, creator of Boogie Woogie (TV series)
 Naved Latif (born 1976), Pakistani cricket player
 Naved Malik (born 1986), Pakistani cricket player
 Naved Sarwar (born 1989), Pakistani cricket player
 Naved Yasin (born 1987), Pakistani cricket player